Abol tabol ('The Weird and the Absurd') is a collection of Bengali children's poems and rhymes composed by Sukumar Ray, first published on 19th September 1923 by U. Ray and Sons publishers. It consists of 46 titled and seven untitled short rhymes (quatrains), all considered to be in the genre of nonsense literature.

Significance
Bengali readers were exposed to a new nonsense fantasy world by the poems in Abol Tabol.  This selection offers the best of Sukumar Ray's world of pun-riddled poetry.

Although it was not understood at the time of its publication, many poems in Abol Tabol contain skilfully hidden satire on the state of society and administration of early 20th-century colonial India - mostly Bengal. Embedding implied hidden meanings of a subversive nature in nonsense rhymes for children, was Ray's clever way of subverting press censorship by the then British administration in India, which was paranoid about seditious and subversive literature.

In analytical literature since 2017, the poems in Abol Tabol have been plotted on a timeline and compared with contemporaneous events, research having yielded plausible connections between historical events and the commentary and satire hidden in many of the poems. A significant perspective on Ray's Abol Tabol has been explored by Hirak Bhattacharya in his article entitled,  " Rethinking Sukumar Ray's Abol Tabol as a Multimodal Text". Bhattacharya contends that, Ray's visionary mind accompanied the poems of Abol Tabol with illustrations. Such sketches imbibed unschooled learners to have a comprehensive understanding of the text without delving deep into the dynamics of alphabetical logarithms. The illustrations accompanying Ray's poems appeal to aesthetic sense of the readers and in  a way creates a whole edifice of perceptual understanding of the poems, appealing all the sensory perceptions. In this way, Bhattacharya, explores the multimodal aspects of the text, that transcends the liminality of a text-centred approach.

Publication history 
Sukumar Ray wrote for the children's magazine Sandesh, started by his father Upendrakishore, in Calcutta (now Kolkata), right from the time of its first publication in 1913. Ray was living in England at that time, where he had traveled at the end of 1911, to study photoengraving and lithography. He returned to India towards the end of 1913, and, after the death of Upendrakishore in 1915, also became the editor of Sandesh, and remained so till the time of his own untimely death in 1923. The poems in Abol Tabol, most of which first appeared in Sandesh, were composed during the period 1915 to 1923. Abol Tabol, meaning The Weird and the Absurd, was originally the name designating a section within Sandesh magazine, where many of these poems were first published. Thirty-nine poems and seven untitled quatrains can be traced back to having first appeared in Sandesh. Seven other poems making up the balance of the collection known as Abol Tabol were selected by Ray, from perhaps previously unpublished manuscripts, to form part of the final collection. Of these, Ray wrote the first and last poems, both originally titled Abol-Tabol, specifically for the collection, possibly in 1923.

Characters
His collection had several characters which became legendary in Bengali literature and culture.  Some characters even have found idiomatic usage in the language.

Some of the most famous characters in "Abol tabol" are:
 Katth Buro (Poem: Katth Buro)
 Head Officer Burrobabu (Poem: Gnof Churi)
 Kumro Potash (Poem: Kumro Potash)
 Gangaram (Poem: Sat Patro)
 Chandidaser Khuroe (Poem: Khuror Kal)
 Bombagorer Raja (Poem: Bombagorer Raja)
 Hnukumukho Hyangla (Poem: Hnukumukho Hyangla)
 Ramgorurer Chhana (Poem: Ramgorurer Chhana)
 Tnyash Goru (Poem: Tnyash Goru)
 Shashtthi Charan (Poem: Palowan)
 Panto Bhoot (Poem: Bhooturey Khela)
 Nera (Poem: Nera Beltolay Jay Kobar)
 Katukutu Buro (Poem: Katukutu Buro)
 Bhisman Lochan Sharma

Bibliography
English Translations of Abol Tabol, in reverse chronological order (newest first).

Rhymes of Whimsy - The Complete Abol Tabol, Translated by Niladri  Roy, Haton Cross Press. First published 2017. Second Edition 2020. 

 This is the only complete translation of all the 53 poems.
The second edition incorporates the original illustrations by Sukumar Ray, replacing those in the first edition which had been drawn anew.
 There is also a dual-language edition of this book with side-by-side Bengali originals and their English translations. Haton Cross Press, 2017
The Tenth Rasa: An Anthology of Indian Nonsense, edited by Michael Heyman, with Sumanyu Satpathy and Anushka Ravishankar.  New Delhi: Penguin, 2007.
 This volume includes, among other Indian nonsense texts, several translations of Sukumar Ray by Chattarji, including some that are not in her solo edition of Abol Tabol.
Abol Tabol: The Nonsense World of Sukumar Ray.  Translated by Sampurna Chattarji.  New Delhi: Puffin, 2004.
 This edition, a partial translation, also has works from Khapchhada, Bohurupee, Other Stories, Haw-Jaw-Baw-Raw-Law, Khai-Khai, and Pagla Dashu.
The Select Nonsense of Sukumar Ray.  Translated by Sukanta Chaudhuri.  New Delhi: OUP, 1987.
 The standard edition of Abol Tabol translations (partial) for many years.
Nonsense Rhymes. Translated by Satyajit Ray.  Calcutta: Writer's Workshop, 1970.
 This volume by the author's son is the slimmest and is difficult to find. Partial translation.
Analytical Works about Abol Tabol, in reverse chronological order (newest first).

Aaloy Dhaka Ondhokar (আলোয় ঢাকা অন্ধকার), by Niladri Roy. Dey's Publishing, Kolkata, 2021 [Published in Bengali].

 This book is the Bengali translation by Niladri Roy of the analyses of all the poems, with explanations of hidden satire, that were originally published in English in Rhymes of Whimsy (see next entry).

Rhymes of Whimsy - The Complete Abol Tabol, with Analyses & Commentary by Niladri  Roy, Haton Cross Press. First published 2017. Second Edition 2020.

 Contains analyses of all the poems, with explanations of hidden satire.
The second edition contains approximately 20% more content and introduces substantially revised and entirely newly discovered information in the analyses.

Fantastic Beasts and How to Sketch Them: The Fabulous Bestiary of Sukumar Ray, by  Poushali Bhadury. (South Asian Review, Vol. 34, No. 1, 2013.)
 Analytical reviews of some of Sukumar Ray's illustrations that accompanied his poems in Abol Tabol, and how they complement the verse.
Colonial India in Children’s Literature, by Supriya Goswami. Routledge, 2012
 This volume includes brief analysis of some of the poems in Abol Tabol. It also analyzes other contemporaneous books.
The World of Sukumar Ray, by Sukanta Chaudhuri in Telling Tales: Children’s Literature in India, Ed. Amit Dasgupta. New Age International Publishers Ltd. Wiley Eastern Ltd. New Delhi, India 1995, 88-96. 
 Commentary on some of the poems in Abol Tabol

References 
4. Bhattacharya, Hirak. "Rethinking Sukumar Ray's Abol Tabol as a Multimodal Text." Bookbird: A Journal of International Children's Literature, vol. 59 no. 1, 2021, p. 64-69. Project MUSE, doi:10.1353/bkb.2021.0000.

External links

Abol Tabol in Wikisource
Abol Tabol English translations and full list of poems

Bengali-language literature
Sukumar Ray
Children's poetry books
1923 children's books
1923 poetry books
Indian poetry collections
Indian children's literature